Joseph Leonard Goldstein ForMemRS (born April 18, 1940) is an American biochemist.  He received the Nobel Prize in Physiology or Medicine in 1985, along with fellow University of Texas Southwestern researcher, Michael Brown, for their studies regarding cholesterol. They discovered that human cells have low-density lipoprotein (LDL) receptors that remove cholesterol from the blood and that when LDL receptors are not present in sufficient numbers, individuals develop hypercholesterolemia and become at risk for cholesterol related diseases, notably coronary heart disease. Their studies led to the development of statin drugs.

Life and career
Goldstein was born in Kingstree, South Carolina, the son of Fannie (Alpert) and Isadore E. Goldstein, who owned a clothing store. Goldstein received his BSci from Washington and Lee University in 1962, and his MD from the University of Texas Southwestern Medical School in 1966. Upon completion of his residency, Goldstein moved to the National Institutes of Health (NIH) in Bethesda, Maryland, where he worked in biochemical genetics. In 1972, Goldstein relocated back to the Southwestern Medical Center, accepting a post as the head of the Division of Medical Genetics.

At the Southwestern Medical Center Goldstein collaborated extensively with Michael Brown, a fellow researcher at the center who had also worked at the NIH. From 1973 to 1985, Goldstein and Brown together published over one hundred major papers. They are both listed in Thomson Reuters’ index of highly cited authors. Frequently mentioned as a candidate for nationally prominent positions in scientific administration, Goldstein, like his colleague Michael Brown, chose to continue hands-on research.

In 1993, their postdoctoral trainees, Wang Xiaodong and Michael Briggs, purified the Sterol Regulatory Element-Binding Proteins (SREBPs), a family of membrane-bound transcription factors. Since 1993,  Goldstein, Brown, and their colleagues have described the unexpectedly complex machinery that proteolytically releases the SREBPs from membranes, thus allowing their migration to the nucleus where they activate all the genes involved in the synthesis of cholesterol and fatty acids. The machinery for generating active SREBPs is tightly regulated by a negative feedback mechanism, which explains how cells maintain the necessary levels of fats and cholesterol in the face of varying environmental circumstances.

Goldstein is chair, Molecular Genetics at University of Texas Southwestern Medical Center. Together, Goldstein and Brown lead a research team that typically includes a dozen doctoral and postdoctoral trainees. They have trained over 145 graduate students and postdoctoral fellows, and five of their former postdoctoral fellows (Thomas C. Südhof, Wang Xiaodong, Helen H. Hobbs, David W. Russell, and Monty Krieger) have been elected to the U.S. National Academy of Sciences. Former postdoctoral fellow Thomas Südhof received the 2013 Nobel Prize in Medicine or Physiology and Helen H. Hobbs received the 2015 Breakthrough Prize in Life Sciences.

In 1988 Goldstein received a National Medal of Science in the field of molecular genetics, and in 2003 Goldstein and Brown won the Albany Medical Center Prize in Medicine and Biomedical Research in recognition for their further work in understanding cholesterol and also the discovery of an insulin-sensitive regulator, which potentially could be used to develop treatments for diabetes mellitus. Goldstein is a member of the U.S. National Academy of Sciences and the Institute of Medicine and he was elected a Foreign Member of the Royal Society (ForMemRS) in 1991.

Goldstein was appointed as Chairman of the Albert Lasker Medical Research Awards jury in 1995, and was a recipient of the award ten years earlier.<ref>"1985 Winners: Albert Lasker Basic Medical Research Award ", Lasker Foundation. Retrieved October 25, 2012.</ref> Since 2000, Goldstein has authored a series of essays on the deep relationship between art and science that appear in the annual Nature Medicine'' supplement that accompanies the Lasker Awards.

Among his professional activities, Goldstein is a member of the Board of Trustees of The Howard Hughes Medical Institute and of The Rockefeller University, where he was elected as a Life Trustee in 2015.  He also serves as chairman of the Board of Scientific Counselors of the Broad Institute, and is a member of the Board of Directors of Regeneron Pharmaceuticals, Inc. He previously served on The Board of Scientific Governors of the Scripps Research Institute, a nonprofit institute that conducts biomedical research.

Awards

Joseph L. Goldstein has been awarded the following:

  2011 – Stadtman Distinguished Scientist Award, American Society for Biochemistry and Molecular Biology
  2007 – Builders of Science Award, Research!America
  2005 – Woodrow Wilson Awards for Public Service
  2005 – Herbert Tabor Award, American Society for Biochemistry and Molecular Biology
  2003 – Albany Medical Center Prize in Medicine and Biomedical Research
  2002 – Kober Medal, Association of American Physicians
  1999 – Warren Alpert Foundation Prize, Harvard Medical School
 1991 – Elected a Foreign Member of the Royal Society (ForMemRS)
  1988 – U.S. National Medal of Science
  1987 – Elected member of the American Philosophical Society
  1986 – Golden Plate Award of the American Academy of Achievement
  1985 – Nobel Prize in Physiology or Medicine
  1985 – Albert Lasker Award for Basic Medical Research
  1985 – William Allan Award, American Society of Human Genetics
  1984 – Louisa Gross Horwitz Prize, Columbia University
  1981 – Gairdner Foundation International Award
  1981 – Elected member of the American Academy of Arts and Sciences
  1980 – Elected member of the National Academy of Sciences
  1979 – Richard Lounsbery Award, U.S. National Academy of Sciences
  1978 – Passano Award, Johns Hopkins University
  1976 – Pfizer Award in Enzyme Chemistry, American Chemical Society

Research papers

Essays on "The Art of Science"

Since 2000, Goldstein has authored a series of essays considering science as a creative pursuit, and explores the links between the art and science.  The essays appear in the journal Nature Medicine, and coincide with the annual announcement of the Lasker Awards, with which Goldstein is affiliated in the capacity of jury chairman.

References

External links

 
  Journal of Clinical Investigation Interview.
 Joseph Goldstein, Nobel Luminaries Project, The Museum of the Jewish People at Beit Hatfutsot

1940 births
Living people
Nobel laureates in Physiology or Medicine
American Nobel laureates
Richard-Lounsbery Award laureates
People from Kingstree, South Carolina
Washington and Lee University alumni
American biochemists
American geneticists
Medical geneticists
Jewish geneticists
Jewish American scientists
Jewish chemists
University of Texas Southwestern Medical Center alumni
University of Texas Southwestern Medical Center faculty
Recipients of the Albert Lasker Award for Basic Medical Research
Members of the United States National Academy of Sciences
Members of the American Philosophical Society
Members of the National Academy of Medicine